Ekspress-AT1 is a Russian Direct-To-Home broadcasting satellite which was launched on 15 March 2014. Part of the Ekspress series of geostationary communications satellites, it is owned and operated by the Russian Satellite Communications Company (RSCC).

Satellite description 
It is based on the Ekspress-1000H satellite bus manufactured by ISS Reshetnev. The satellite carries 32 Ku-band transponders, providing satellite television to Western and Central Russia, as well as Western and Central Siberia, and almost all of Kazakhstan. The planned service life of the satellite is at least 15 years.

Launch 
It was launched, with Ekspress-AT2 communications satellite, on 15 March 2014 at 23:08:00 UTC, from Baikonur Cosmodrome at Site 81/24 in the framework of Russian Federal Space Program for 2006–2015, approved by the Government Decree No. 635 signed on 22 October 2005 by Prime Minister Mikhail Fradkov.

Mission 
Express-AT1 was launched into orbit on 15 March 2014. The commercial operation of the satellite started on 22 April 2014.

References

External links

Ekspress satellites
Spacecraft launched in 2014
Satellites using the Ekspress bus
2014 in Russia